Aghbugha I Jaqeli (1356 – 1395) was a Georgian prince (mtavari) and Atabeg of Samtskhe from 1389 to 1395. Aghbugha was a Son of Prince Shalva. After his father's death Aghbugha was appointed as a co-ruler (he ruled with his uncle Beka II) of Meskheti by Georgian king Bagrat V. During 1381-1386 he renewed The book of laws which was established by his Great-great-grandfather, Beka Jaqeli. This book firstly was called "Aghbugha's law", then "Book of laws set by Beka-Aghbugha".

References

House of Jaqeli
Atabegs of Samtskhe
14th-century people from Georgia (country)
1395 deaths
1356 births